Mallory is an unincorporated community in Polk County, in the U.S. state of Minnesota. Mallory is 830 feet [253 m] above sea level and lies in the Central Time Zone.

History
A post office called Mallory was established in 1880, and remained in operation until 1916. The community was named for Charles P. Mallory, a local businessperson in the lumber industry.

References

Unincorporated communities in Polk County, Minnesota
Unincorporated communities in Minnesota